Lüdenscheid-Brügge station is on the Hagen–Dieringhausen railway from Hagen Hauptbahnhof to Dieringhausen station in the German state of North Rhine-Westphalia. It is classified by Deutsche Bahn as a category 7 station. Because of the branch line to Lüdenscheid, it is classified as a separation station. The station is located on the edge of the Lüdenscheid hamlet of Brügge. There is an island platform with tracks which connects with the bus stop at ground level. The station is known nationally for its elevated disused but preserved signalbox. The station was called Brügge (Westfalen) until 10 December 2017.

History 
The Hagen–Dieringhausen railway (also called the Volmetalbahn: “Volme Valley Railway”) from Hagen was opened to Dieringhausen in stages between 1871 and 1893. Numerous apartments for the railwaymen were built around the station area because Brügge was a busy station and many residents were employed in the station’s operation. During this period the signalbox, a roundhouse with a turntable and a water tower were built on the site. Until 1986, there was a direct passenger service to Cologne. In 2009, the former art nouveau style station building was demolished because it was in danger of collapse as there had been no restoration to the old building in recent years. The old platform area of Brügge station with the platforms for the line to Dieringhausen and Cologne which were connected via an underground passage to the station forecourt has been removed in 2016. The station was renamed Lüdenscheid-Brügge on 10 December 2017.

Today  
The freight operations in Brügge is limited to the line from Krummenerl, which is used by freight trains from the local quarry, which continue on the Volme Valley Railway through Brügge to the north. In 2016 the station was completed rebuild with new track layout and installation of an electronic signal box. There is now an island platform with two platform tracks. December 2017 services on the Volme Valley Railway have been extended from Meinerzhagen to Brügge.
The facade and roof of the old signal box at Brügge station, which dates back to 1927 have been renovated.

Rail services 

The station is served by two Regionalbahn lines:

The RB52 trains reverse at the station.

Bus services 

Bus services are operated by Märkische Verkehrsgesellschaft (Märkische Transport Company, MVG) and Busverkehr Ruhr-Sieg (Ruhr-Sieg Bus Transport, BRS) over the following seven bus lines:

Notes

References

External links 

 
 

Railway stations in North Rhine-Westphalia
Railway stations in Germany opened in 1874
Lüdenscheid